Dennis R. Frederickson (born July 27, 1939) is a Republican politician from Minnesota and a former Minnesota State Senator. He was first elected in 1980 when he ran for the seat being vacated by Senator Carl Jensen, who was appointed to the Minnesota Tax Court and did not seek re-election. He was re-elected in 1982, 1986, 1990, 1992, 1996, 2000, 2002 and 2006, receiving only one serious challenge for the position back in 1982 from former New Ulm mayor and state representative Tony Eckstein. In recent campaigns, his re-election committee was chaired by former state senator Earl Renneke.

Frederickson most recently represented District 21. Prior to legislative redistricting in 1990 and 2000, the area was known as District 28 and District 23, respectively. Through the years, he represented all or portions of Blue Earth, Brown, Cottonwood, Le Sueur, Lyon, McLeod, Murray, Nicollet, Redwood, Renville, Sibley, and Watonwan counties.

Rural roots and family background
Frederickson was born and raised on a farm in Redwood County near Morgan. He graduated from Morgan High School in 1957 and the University of Minnesota in 1961 with a B.S. degree in agricultural economics. After graduation, he spent five years on active duty in the U.S. Navy as a pilot. Following active duty, he flew in the Naval Air Reserve for three years, being honorably discharged with the rank of Lieutenant Commander.
 
Frederickson returned to the family farm in 1967 and was first elected to public office in 1972 as a Redwood County Commissioner, serving eight years. He served five years on the Redwood County Nursing Home Board, four as chairman, and is a former adult 4-H leader, Sunday school teacher, local Lions Club member and past president, and State Home Economics Advisory Council member. He also served on the Redwood Electric Cooperative Board of Directors for 20 years.  He has since retired from farming and moved to New Ulm.

Senate representation and leadership
As senator, Frederickson earned a reputation as a leader in issues relevant to environment and natural resources, and has received many awards for his service, noted in the following table. His special legislative concerns also included local government, finance and agriculture.   

Over the years, Frederickson served on the Senate Agriculture and Natural Resources, Capital Investment, Elections and Ethics, Finance, Gaming Regulation, Governmental Operations, Jobs, Energy & Community Development, Local Government and Urban Affairs, Public Employees & Pensions, Rules & Administration, and Telecommunications, Energy & Utilities committees, and on various relevant subcommittees. Of those committees, he was a member of the Senate Environment and Natural Resources Committee for 26 years and of the Environment Budget Division for 24 years. He was President Pro Tempore of the Senate from January 2007 until his retirement.  He also served on the Legislative-Citizen Commission on Minnesota Resources (LCCMR), which made recommendations to the Minnesota Legislature on how to spend money from the Environmental Trust Fund, and on the Legislative Commission on Planning and Fiscal Policy.

On March 30, 2010, Frederickson announced that he would not seek a tenth term in the Minnesota Senate.

References

External links 

Senator Dennis R. Frederickson official Minnesota Legislature site
Minnesota State Senator Dennis Frederickson  official campaign site
 
Voting record at Minnesota Public Radio Votetracker

1939 births
Living people
People from Redwood County, Minnesota
County commissioners in Minnesota
Republican Party Minnesota state senators
University of Minnesota College of Food, Agricultural and Natural Resource Sciences alumni
21st-century American politicians
People from New Ulm, Minnesota
United States Navy officers
United States Navy reservists
United States Naval Aviators
Military personnel from Minnesota
Farmers from Minnesota